Two Rivers High School may refer to:

 Two Rivers High School (Arkansas), unincorporated Yell County, Arkansas, near Plainview and Ola
 Two Rivers High School (Minnesota), Mendota Heights, Minnesota
 Two Rivers High School (Wisconsin), Two Rivers, Wisconsin
 Two Rivers Magnet Middle School, East Hartford, Connecticut

See also
 Two Rivers (disambiguation)